Anders Kenneth Jonatan Berg (born 9 May 1985) is a Swedish former professional footballer who played as a midfielder. His natural position was on the central midfield, but he also worked well as a right winger.

Career 
After playing for his local club and Torsby IF, he joined IFK Göteborg in 2002. After a couple of years his younger brother Marcus Berg (now being a player for the national team of Sweden) also joined IFK Göteborg. Jonatan wasn't a pick for the starting line up and therefore he went to loan in 2006 to the Gothenburg rival of GAIS where he played as a starter. In 2007, he went on loan to Trelleborgs FF in 2007. In 2008, he stayed at IFK Göteborg but played only 9 games, of which 7 was as a starter. In 2009, he moved on to Gefle IF. There, he became an important player with great teamwork and being good on set pieces. In July 2010, after having a trial he moved on to Italy and Serie C1, joining Taranto which w aiming to reach Serie B.

External links
 
 GAIS profile

1985 births
Living people
Swedish footballers
Swedish expatriate footballers
Allsvenskan players
Superettan players
IFK Göteborg players
GAIS players
Trelleborgs FF players
Gefle IF players
IK Sirius Fotboll players
Varbergs BoIS players
Taranto F.C. 1927 players
Expatriate footballers in Italy
Association football midfielders